The 2021–22 season was the 72nd season in the existence of Olympique Lyonnais and the club's 33rd consecutive season in the top flight of French football. In addition to the domestic league, Lyon participated in this season's editions of the Coupe de France and the UEFA Europa League. The club was expelled from the domestic cup due to crowd trouble during their game against Paris FC.

Players

First-team squad

Out on loan

Transfers

In

Out

Transfer summary

Spending

Summer:  €10,500,000

Winter:  €16,400,000

Total:  €26,900,000

Income

Summer:  €51,000,000

Winter:  €56,800,000

Total:  €107,800,000

Net Expenditure

Summer:  €40,500,000

Winter:  €40,400,000

Total:  €80,900,000

Pre-season and friendlies

Competitions

Overall record

Ligue 1

League table

Results summary

Results by round

Matches
The league fixtures were announced on 25 June 2021.

Coupe de France
Due to violent behavior by their fan base, Lyon was kicked out of the Coupe de France.

UEFA Europa League

Group stage
The draw for the group stage was held on 27 August 2021.

Knockout phase

Round of 16
The draw for the round of 16 was held on 25 February 2022.

Quarter-finals
The draw for the quarter-finals was held on 18 March 2022.

Statistics

Appearances and goals

|-
! colspan=14 style=background:#dcdcdc; text-align:center| Goalkeepers

|-
! colspan=14 style=background:#dcdcdc; text-align:center| Defenders

|-
! colspan=14 style=background:#dcdcdc; text-align:center| Midfielders

|-
! colspan=14 style=background:#dcdcdc; text-align:center| Forwards

|-
! colspan=14 style=background:#dcdcdc; text-align:center| Players transferred out during the season

Goalscorers

References

Olympique Lyonnais seasons
Lyon
2021–22 UEFA Europa League participants seasons